Picket Fences is an American family drama television series about the residents of the town of Rome, Wisconsin, created and produced by David E. Kelley. The show ran from September 18, 1992, to June 26, 1996, on the CBS television network in the United States. It sometimes struggled to maintain a stable primetime audience and had fluctuating ratings, due in part to its Friday night death slot. In its first season on the air it placed 63rd in the prime-time Nielsen ratings and in its second season it moved to 61st. The show's exteriors were shot in the L.A. suburb of Monrovia, California, with many of the townspeople appearing in the background of episodes.

Overview
The series follows the lives of the residents of the small town of Rome, Wisconsin, where weird things happen, including cows' udders exploding and people turning up dead in freezers. The show dealt with unusual topics for the primetime television of the period, such as  abortion, incest, homophobia and LGBT adoption, transsexuality, racism, belief in God, medical ethics, polygamy, polyamory, adolescent sexuality, date rape, cryonics, the Holocaust, shoe fetishism, masturbation, animal sacrifice,  spontaneous human combustion, and constitutional rights. Illustrative of the subject matter is that the regular cast included a judge, two lawyers, and a medical examiner. Religious issues were frequently discussed, and the town's Catholic and Episcopal priests were frequently recurring characters, as well as lawyer Douglas Wambaugh's relationships in his local Jewish temple.

The Brock family
Struggling to maintain order in the community is Sheriff Jimmy Brock (Tom Skerritt). Sheriff Brock is 52 years old, married to the town doctor, Jill (Kathy Baker), his second wife. They attempt are raising their three children, Kimberly (Holly Marie Combs)  from Jimmy's first marriage to Lydia Brock (Cristine Rose), Matthew (Justin Shenkarow) and Zachary (Adam Wylie).

Sheriff's office
Maxine 'Max' Stewart (Lauren Holly) and Kenny Lacos (Costas Mandylor) are impulsive and slightly immature sheriff's deputies. Kelly Connell played medical examiner Carter Pike (who regularly begged to be deputized) and Zelda Rubinstein portrayed police dispatcher Ginny Weedon.

The courthouse
Bombastic lawyer Douglas Wambaugh (Fyvush Finkel) usually irritated Judge Henry Bone (Ray Walston). Wambaugh refused to hear any confessions of guilt from his clients as he feared that it would only stand in the way of adequately defending them in court; and Bone's rulings seemed to be directed more by his own moral compass than by points of law, though his decisions were almost never reversed. After several prosecutors came and went, Don Cheadle joined the cast as John Littleton.

Townspeople
Other actors who were in the cast included Marlee Matlin as Mayor Laurie Bey / The Dancing Bandit, Richard Masur as Ed Lawson, Roy Brocksmith as elementary school principal Michael Oslo, Jack Murdock as ethically challenged city councilman Harold Lundstrom, Roy Dotrice as Father Gary Barrett, a Catholic priest, and Dabbs Greer as the Reverend Henry Novotny, priest of the local Episcopal church.

Mayors
The town frequently changed mayors, who often met strange fates:

 Mayor Bill Pugen (Michael Keenan): Spontaneous human combustion after his murder conviction
 Mayor Rachel Harris (Leigh Taylor-Young): Hounded from office for starring in an adult film 25 years before
 Acting Mayor Howard Buss (Robert Cornthwaite): Suffered from Alzheimer's disease, fatally shot by his son
 Acting Mayor Jill Brock (Kathy Baker): Jailed in connection with school busing; dropped out of bid for election in her own right
 Mayor Ed Lawson (Richard Masur): Entombed in a freezer by his wife, then decapitated
 Mayor Laurie Bey (Marlee Matlin): Mayor at end of third season, despite bank robbery convictions as "The Dancing Bandit". She was offered the job as part of her 3,000 hours community service sentencing.  She returns after her maternity leave is over.
 Acting Mayor Maxine Stewart (Lauren Holly): Shot and wounded by a shock jock's fan (while Bey was on maternity leave).

Cast
{| class="wikitable plainrowheaders"
|-
!scope="col" rowspan="2"|Actor
!scope="col" rowspan="2"|Character
!scope="col" colspan="4"|Seasons
|-
! scope="col" style="width:12%;" | 1
! scope="col" style="width:12%;" | 2
! scope="col" style="width:12%;" | 3
! scope="col" style="width:12%;" | 4
|-
! colspan="6" style="background:#ccf;" | Main characters
|-
!scope="row"| Tom Skerritt
| style="text-align:center;"| Jimmy Brock
| colspan="4" 
|-
!scope="row"|Kathy Baker
| style="text-align:center;" | Jill Brock
| colspan="4" 
|-
!scope="row"|Lauren Holly
| style="text-align:center;" | Maxine Stewart
| colspan="4" 
|-
!scope="row"|Costas Mandylor
| style="text-align:center;" | Kenny Lacos
| colspan="4" 
|-
!scope="row"|Holly Marie Combs
| style="text-align:center;" | Kimberly Brock
| colspan="4" 
|-
!scope="row"|Justin Shenkarow
| style="text-align:center;" | Matthew Brock
| colspan="4" 
|-
!scope="row"|Adam Wylie
| style="text-align:center;" | Zachary Brock
| colspan="4" 
|-
!scope="row"|Fyvush Finkel
| style="text-align:center;" | Douglas Wambaugh
| colspan="1" 
| colspan="3" 
|-
!scope="row"|Kelly Connell
| style="text-align:center;" | Carter Pike
| colspan="1" 
| colspan="3" 
|-
!scope="row"|Zelda Rubinstein
| style="text-align:center;" | Ginny Weedon
| colspan="2" 
| colspan="2" 
|-
!scope="row"|Don Cheadle
| style="text-align:center;" | John Littleton
| colspan="1" 
| colspan="1" 
| colspan="3" 
|-
!scope="row"|Marlee Matlin
| style="text-align:center;" | Laurie Bey
| colspan="1" 
| colspan="1" 
| colspan="2" 
|-
!scope="row"|Ray Walston
| style="text-align:center;" | Henry Bone
| colspan="1" 
| colspan="3" 
|-
! colspan="6" style="background:#ccf;" | Recurring characters
|-
!scope="row"| Dabbs Greer
| style="text-align:center;"| Henry Novotony
| colspan="4" 
|-
!scope="row"|Roy Dotrice
| style="text-align:center;" | Gary Barrett
| colspan="4" 
|-
!scope="row"|Roy Brocksmith
| style="text-align:center;" | Michael Oslo
| colspan="4" 
|-
!scope="row"|Denis Arndt
| style="text-align:center;" | Franklin Dell
| colspan="4" 
|-
!scope="row"|Sam Anderson
| style="text-align:center;" | Donald Morrell
| colspan="3" 
| colspan="1" 
|-
!scope="row"|Michael Keenan
| style="text-align:center;" | Bill Pugen
| colspan="2" 
| colspan="2" 
|-
!scope="row"|Robert Cornthwaite
| style="text-align:center;" | Howard Buss
| colspan="2" 
| colspan="2" 
|-
!scope="row"|Elisabeth Moss
| style="text-align:center;" | Cynthia Parks
| colspan="3" 
| colspan="1" 
|-
!scope="row"|Leigh Taylor-Young
| style="text-align:center;" | Rachel Harris
| colspan="1" 
| colspan="2" 
| colspan="1" 
|-
!scope="row"|Richard Masur
| style="text-align:center;" | Ed Lawson
| colspan="1" 
| colspan="1" 
| colspan="1" 
| colspan="1" 
|-
!scope="row"|Amy Aquino
| style="text-align:center;" | Joanna Diamond
| colspan="3" 
| colspan="1" 
|-
!scope="row"|Matthew Glave
| style="text-align:center;" | Bud Skeeter
| colspan="3" 
| colspan="1" 
|}

Episodes

Picket Fences had a total of 88 episodes and four seasons.

Crossovers
The series had two crossover episodes with another David E. Kelley series, Chicago Hope, one occurring in each series. In the first, on Picket Fences, Dr. Jill Brock accompanies Douglas Wambaugh to Chicago Hope Hospital over concerns of his heart. In the second, Wambaugh is back at Chicago Hope Hospital causing trouble for the doctors. Lauren Holly later joined the cast of Chicago Hope as Dr. Jeremy Hanlon and Tom Skerritt appeared in a different role as a guest star.

Also, as the story goes, David E. Kelley and Chris Carter (creator of The X-Files) were talking in a parking lot on the Fox lot one day and thought it might be interesting to have Mulder and Scully visit Rome, Wisconsin for an X-Files episode. Originally, the two shows would be shot with different viewpoints one from the X-Files perspective and the other from Picket Fences. The official approval was never given by Fox and CBS, so the only remnants remaining of this effort are the X-Files episode "Red Museum" and the Picket Fences episode "Away in the Manger" having similar plotlines involving cows. While every reference to Picket Fences has been purged from the X-Files episode, there still are some small winks left in the Picket Fences episode referring to the happenings at The X-Files and some minor characters there.

Ratings

Adaptation
The series was adapted in India in Hindi language and aired on StarPlus as Kehta Hai Dil from 2002 to 2005 produced by UTV Software Communications. However, the Indian version in between deviated entirely from the story of Picket Fences.

Home media
On June 19, 2007, 20th Century Fox Home Entertainment released the first season of Picket Fences on DVD in Region 1.

On August 20, 2014, Season 1 was released in Australia.

Season 2 was released in Australia in December 2014.

Season 3 was released in Australia in March 2016.

The complete series (seasons 1–4) was released through ViaVision (Australia) in 2016.  The collection is considered a Region 0 DVD, playable on all DVD players.

All seasons are also available on Region 2 formatted DVDs in Germany.

Since Thanksgiving 2021, the entire series has been available to stream on Hulu.  Prior to this, Hulu had streamed seasons 1-2 only, and the series had disappeared from Hulu for several years prior to it re-releasing on Hulu in 2021.

Awards and nominations

Picket Fences won fourteen Emmy Awards (including "Best Dramatic Series" twice) and one Golden Globe Award in its four-year run. A substantial following for the show persists today, and it is popular as rerun in western Europe.  It was rerun in French in Canada on Canadian Broadcasting Corporation under the title Bienvenue à Rome, USA.

In 1997, the episode "Heart of Saturday Night" was ranked #96 on TV Guides 100 Greatest Episodes of All-Time.

In 2002, the character of Douglas Wambaugh was ranked 47th on TV Guides 50 Greatest Television Characters of All Time list.

References

External links 
 
 

 
1990s American drama television series
1992 American television series debuts
1996 American television series endings
CBS original programming
English-language television shows
Television series by 20th Century Fox Television
Television shows set in Wisconsin
Primetime Emmy Award for Outstanding Drama Series winners
Primetime Emmy Award-winning television series
Television series created by David E. Kelley